Fındıcak can refer to:

 Fındıcak, Çerkeş
 Fındıcak, Gemlik
 Fındıcak, Mudurnu
 Fındıcak, Osmancık